Kanha (Brahmi script:𑀓𑀦𑁆𑀳, Ka-nha, c. 1st century BCE) was a ruler of the Satavahana dynasty of India. Historian Himanshu Prabha Ray assigns his reign to the period c. 100-70 BCE.

Kanha has been mentioned as "Krishna" (IAST: Kṛṣṇa) in the Puranas. According to the Puranic genealogy, he was the brother of the first Satavahana king Simuka (whose name varies according to the different Puranas).

Nasik cave
Besides the legendary Puranas, Kanha's existence is also supported by an epigraphic record at Cave No.19 in the Nasik Caves. He is identified with the "Kanha-raja" (King Kanha) of "Satavahana-kula" (Satavahana family) mentioned in a Nashik cave inscription. The inscription states that the cave was excavated by maha-matra (officer-in-charge) of the shramanas (non-Vedic ascetics) during Kanha's reign. Based on this, Sudhakar Chattopadhyaya concludes that Kanha favoured Buddhism, and had an administrative department dedicated to the welfare of Buddhist monks. Also, the term maha-matra, well known in Ashokan inscriptions, indicates that the early Satavahanas followed the Mauryan administrative model.

Cave No19 at the Nasik Caves is located on the ground floor, to the left of the entrance of Cave No.18, and right under cave No.20. Cave No.19 has one inscription mentioning the dedication by a government officer during the rule of king Krishna of the Satavahanas:

This makes Cave No.19 one of the earliest to be excavated at Nasik Caves.

References

Bibliography 
 

1st-century BC Indian monarchs
Satavahana dynasty